George James McVitie (born 7 September 1948) is an English footballer who played as a right winger in the Football League.

McVitie's club of longest service was Carlisle United for whom he played in two spells. These were sandwiched around playing for West Bromwich Albion and Oldham Athletic. He ended his senior career playing in Scotland for Dumfries club, Queen of the South.

References

External links
George McVitie's Career

1948 births
Living people
English footballers
Footballers from Carlisle, Cumbria
Association football midfielders
Carlisle United F.C. players
West Bromwich Albion F.C. players
Oldham Athletic A.F.C. players
Queen of the South F.C. players
English Football League players